Tahay is an island in the Outer Hebrides of Scotland. The name originates from the Old Norse tagg-øy meaning island with a prominent hill.

The island is used for sheep grazing and peat cutting.

History
In 1846, six families who had been evicted from their homes on Pabbay to make way for sheep, moved to the previously uninhabited island of Tahay. Although the island has no arable land, they hoped to make a living from fishing.  However this proved too hard and they gave up the struggle in the 1850s and emigrated to Australia.

Tahay is owned by the Scottish Government.

References

Islands of the Sound of Harris
Uist islands
Uninhabited islands of the Outer Hebrides